Ozodes sexmaculatus is a species of beetle in the family Cerambycidae. It was described by Zajciw in 1967.

References

Necydalopsini
Beetles described in 1967